The 2017 Kremlin  Cup (also known as the 2017 VTB Kremlin Cup for sponsorship reasons) was a tennis tournament played on indoor hard courts. It was the 28th edition of the Kremlin Cup for the men and the 22nd edition for the women. The tournament was part of the ATP World Tour 250 Series of the 2017 ATP World Tour, and of the Premier Series of the 2017 WTA Tour. It was held at the Olympic Stadium in Moscow, Russia, from 16 October through 22 October 2017.

ATP singles main-draw entrants

Seeds

 Rankings are as of October 9, 2017

Other entrants
The following players received wildcards into the singles main draw:
  Teymuraz Gabashvili 
  Konstantin Kravchuk
  Roman Safiullin

The following players received entry using a protected ranking into the singles main draw:
  Ričardas Berankis

The following players received entry from the qualifying draw:
  Mirza Bašić
  Yuki Bhambri
  Filip Krajinović
  Lukáš Rosol

The following player received entry as a lucky loser:
  Alexander Bublik

Withdrawals
Before the tournament
 Thomaz Bellucci →replaced by  Blaž Kavčič
 Karen Khachanov →replaced by  Alexander Bublik
 Feliciano López →replaced by  Evgeny Donskoy
 Janko Tipsarević →replaced by  Dušan Lajović

Retirements
 Blaž Kavčič
 Jiří Veselý

ATP doubles main-draw entrants

Seeds

1 Rankings are as of October 9, 2017

Other entrants
The following pairs received wildcards into the doubles main draw:
  Aslan Karatsev /  Richard Muzaev
  Konstantin Kravchuk /  Andrey Rublev

Withdrawals
During the tournament
  Jiří Veselý

WTA singles main-draw entrants

Seeds

 Rankings are as of October 9, 2017

Other entrants
The following players received wildcards into the singles main draw:
  Olesya Pervushina
  Maria Sharapova

The following players received entry from the qualifying draw:
  Kaia Kanepi
  Vera Lapko
  Polina Monova
  Elena Rybakina

Withdrawals
Before the tournament
  Dominika Cibulková →replaced by  Donna Vekić
  Johanna Konta →replaced by  Tímea Babos
  Svetlana Kuznetsova →replaced by  Maryna Zanevska
  Jeļena Ostapenko →replaced by  Irina-Camelia Begu
  Carla Suárez Navarro →replaced by  Natalia Vikhlyantseva

Retirements
  Daria Gavrilova
  Magdaléna Rybáriková

WTA doubles main-draw entrants

Seeds

1 Rankings are as of October 9, 2017

Other entrants
The following pair received a wildcard into the doubles main draw:
  Anna Blinkova /  Elena Rybakina

Champions

Men's singles

 Damir Džumhur def.  Ričardas Berankis, 6–2, 1–6, 6–4

Women's singles

 Julia Görges def.  Daria Kasatkina, 6–1, 6–2

Men's doubles

 Max Mirnyi /  Philipp Oswald def.  Damir Džumhur /  Antonio Šančić, 6–3, 7–5

Women's doubles

 Tímea Babos /  Andrea Hlaváčková def.  Nicole Melichar /  Anna Smith, 6–2, 3–6, [10–3]

References

External links
 

2017
Kremlin Cup
Kremlin Cup
Kremlin Cup
Kremlin Cup
Kremlin Cup